Almanzor Hutchinson (January 17, 1811 – June 12, 1893) was an American farmer and politician from New York.

Life
Hutchinson was born in Remsen, Oneida County, New York, in 1811. In 1816, the family removed to a farm in Gaines, then in Genesee County, since 1824 in Orleans County, New York. In 1845, he married Mary G. Short (1821–1903), and they had several children.

He was a member of the New York State Assembly (Orleans Co.) in 1857, 1858 and 1859; and of the New York State Senate (29th D.) in 1862 and 1863.

He died at the age of 82 and was buried at the Mount Albion Cemetery in Albion.

Sources
The New York Civil List compiled by Franklin Benjamin Hough, Stephen C. Hutchins and Edgar Albert Werner (1870; pg. 443, 485, 487 and 489)
Biographical Sketches of the State Officers and the Members of the Legislature of the State of New York in 1862 and '63 by William D. Murphy (1863; pg. 79ff)
Mount Albion Cemetery records

1811 births
1893 deaths
Republican Party New York (state) state senators
People from Remsen, New York
People from Orleans County, New York
Republican Party members of the New York State Assembly
19th-century American politicians